James Eaton (1783–1856/1857) was an officer of the Royal Navy. He served aboard  at the Battle of Trafalgar; as signal midshipman, he was the first person to pass on Nelson's famous signal to the fleet; "England expects that every man will do his duty".

Career
Born in London in 1783, Eaton entered the navy in 1799 during the French Revolutionary Wars. He was serving aboard the 74-gun  during the Battle of Algeciras Bay on 6 July 1801. Hannibal was captured during the battle. Eaton was repatriated at some stage and by 1803 was a midshipman aboard  when she cut out several vessels in Quiberon Bay. He was appointed signal midshipman aboard HMS Temeraire by 1805, and served as such at Trafalgar, being promoted to lieutenant the following year.

He was later wounded while serving aboard  when taking a convoy out to China. He served at the capture of Java in 1811, and in 1813 distinguished himself while aboard  when he helped in the rescue of the crew of a Swedish vessel. He finally retired from the navy with the rank of commander in 1842. He was subsequently awarded the Naval General Service Medal with two clasps for the actions he had served in during his naval career.

He settled in West Bromwich in 1837, and by 1839 he was living at Hill House where he died in either 1856 or 1857. He is buried at All Saints Church in Charlemont, West Bromwich. In 2005 as part of the Trafalgar bicentenary celebrations, his memorial in All Saints Churchyard was rededicated.

See also

References

Sources

1783 births
1850s deaths
Royal Navy officers
Royal Navy personnel of the French Revolutionary Wars
Royal Navy personnel of the Napoleonic Wars
Military personnel from London